Seth Neiman (born June 27, 1954) is an American computer industry businessperson and venture capitalist in California, and a professional racing driver.

He is the team principal of Flying Lizard Motorsports, which participates in the United SportsCar Championship He currently resides in San Francisco, California.

Youth
Neiman was born in East Liverpool, Ohio and grew up in Dayton, Ohio. His mother was Judith Klapper Neiman and father was Ralph Bernard Neiman. The second child of four, he had two sisters and a younger brother. 

He graduated from Ohio State University with a Bachelor's degree in philosophy and did graduate work in computer science.

Business career
Neiman was a system architect at Maxitron Corporation in Marin County during the mid-1980s, and then Vice President of Product Development at Dahlgren Control Systems in San Francisco. In 1988, he became Vice President of Product Development for the TOPS Division of Sun Microsystems, that was developing the TOPS network file server system.

In 1994, he joined the venture capital firm Crosspoint Venture Partners, and becoming a general partner before departing. In 1995, he founded Brocade Communications Systems.
Neiman served as a lead investor and board member of various broadband computer networking companies, including Foundry Networks, Avanex, iPass, Shoreline, Juniper Networks, and NexPrise.

He has been Chairman of the Board of eSilicon Corporation since 2011, and a Director at AlephCloud Systems Inc. since 2013. He is also a Director at the facial expression recognition system company Emotient, Inc.

Racing career
Neiman formed Flying Lizard Motorsports team in 2003. In 2005, he competed in the ALMS GT2 class for the Porsche team as well as finishing third in GT2 class in the 24 Hours of Le Mans. He finished 4th at Le Mans the following year and finished 9th in ALMS GT2 points for the same team in 2006. He also drove in four SCCA World Challenge races in the Touring Car class.

In 2007, he finished 10th in ALMS and the car failed to finish at Le Mans. In 2008, he captured a career best 5th place in ALMS GT2 points and finished 6th at Le Mans. In 2009, he again failed to finish at Le Mans and finished 7th in ALMS points.

He returned to the Flying Lizards team he owns in 2010, and competed in his first 24 Hours of Daytona, finishing 9th overall and 2nd in GT.

24 Hours of Le Mans results

IMSA SportsCar Championship results
(key)(Races in bold indicate pole position, Results are overall/class)

References

1954 births
Living people
24 Hours of Daytona drivers
24 Hours of Le Mans drivers
American computer businesspeople
American Le Mans Series drivers
American venture capitalists
Businesspeople from Ohio
Businesspeople from San Francisco
Racing drivers from Dayton, Ohio
Racing drivers from San Francisco
Rolex Sports Car Series drivers
Sun Microsystems people
WeatherTech SportsCar Championship drivers